CrocBITE is an online database of crocodile attacks reported on humans. The non-profit online research tool helps to scientifically analyze crocodile behavior via complex models. Users are encouraged to feed information in a crowdsourcing manner. The uploaded information needs to be verifiable. The database provides key insights into crocodile attack patterns and draws inferences to save human lives.

About
It is a compilation of government records, individual reports, registered contributors and historical data. Dr Simon Pooley, Junior Research fellow, Imperial College London joined hands to further the studies. The collaboration culminated when Dr Pooley met Dr Britton at the IUCN Crocodile Specialist Group, in Louisiana in 2014. Brandon was instrumental in designing the database and work on the IT infrastructure.

The research already has yielded pertinent observations that provide inside into crocodile attacks. It was observed that most attacks on humans occur from bites of Saltwater crocodile as against the popular understanding of Nile crocodiles taking the top spot. This is not, however, believed to be the actual case, as most attacks by the Nile crocodile are believed to go unreported or only reported on a local level. The broad category of Nile crocodile attacks were segmented into West African crocodile and Crocodylus niloticus (the Nile Crocodile) species to get a clear understanding of their respective attack zones.

The objective is that the information will used by communities and conservation managers to help inform and educate people about how to keep safe. The information is vital for Australia and Africa where such attacks are more likely than in other parts of the world. This is the only database of its kind with such comprehensive collection of information made available online.

See also
Crocodile attack
Battle of Ramree Island

References

External links 
 Official Website

Research
Crocodilian attacks
Animal attacks in Australia
Databases
Non-profit technology
Crocodilians